"The Corbomite Maneuver" is the tenth episode of the first season of the American science fiction television series Star Trek. Written by Jerry Sohl and directed by Joseph Sargent, it first aired on November 10, 1966. In the episode, the Enterprise encounters a massive and powerful alien starship and its unusual commander. The episode has been well-received and frequently appears on lists of the best episodes in the series.

Casting 
The episode features a then 7-year-old Clint Howard – brother of actor and director Ron Howard – who plays the alien at the end (with an overdubbed voice provided by Walker Edmiston).

This was the first regular episode produced after the two pilots and the first to include DeForest Kelley as Dr. Leonard McCoy, Nichelle Nichols as Lt. Uhura (in a yellow uniform rather than red) and Grace Lee Whitney as Yeoman Rand. Because episodes were not aired in production order (a trait throughout the entire run of the original series), audiences had already been introduced to these three nine weeks earlier, in the series' debut episode, "The Man Trap".

Plot 
The USS Enterprise, commanded by Captain James T. Kirk, finishes a third day of star mapping when novice navigator Lt. Dave Bailey spots a large spinning multi-colored cube floating in space. He advocates attacking it with phasers. Kirk instead orders the ship to back away from the object. The cube pursues them, emitting harmful radiation, and Kirk reluctantly destroys it.

As Kirk is having lunch in his quarters, a gigantic glowing sphere approaches the Enterprise, filling the bridge viewscreen even at low magnification. Commander Balok identifies his ship as the Fesarius, the flagship of the "First Federation", explaining that the destroyed cube was a border marker. Balok ignores Kirk's greetings and announces that he will destroy the Enterprise for trespassing into First Federation territory and destroying the marker buoy. He gives the crew ten minutes to pray to their deities. First Officer Spock obtains a visual of Balok, a blue-skinned humanoid with constantly shifting facial features. Bailey succumbs to hysteria, and Kirk orders him off the bridge. Dr. McCoy rebukes Kirk, arguing that Bailey's outburst was a result of Kirk putting too much pressure on him, and pointing out that he warned Kirk of Bailey's condition ahead of time. The argument inspires Kirk to try bluffing Balok. He tells Balok that the Enterprise contains "corbomite", a substance that automatically destroys any attacker, and claims he has little regard for the fact that the Enterprise would also be destroyed in the exchange. While Kirk awaits a response, Bailey contritely asks permission to resume his duties, which Kirk grants. Balok demands proof of corbomite's existence, but when Kirk refuses, he does not destroy the Enterprise. Instead, a small tug ship detaches from the Fesarius and tows the Enterprise deep into First Federation space, where Balok states the crew will be interned on an Earth-like planet and the Enterprise destroyed. Intuiting that the tug ship's tractor beam cannot be as powerful as that of the Fesarius, Kirk orders the Enterprise to engage the engines at right angles to their course. Just as its engines are about to explode from overload, the Enterprise breaks free. This apparently disables the alien vessel, as the crew picks up a distress call which its mother ship does not answer.

Though recognizing this may be a trap, Kirk, McCoy, and Bailey form a boarding party to render assistance. They beam over and discover that the "Balok" on their monitor was an effigy (creature design by Wah Chang). The real Balok, looking like a hyperintelligent human child, enthusiastically welcomes them aboard. He explains that he was merely testing the Enterprise and its crew to discover their true intentions. As Kirk and company relax, Balok expresses a desire to learn more about humans and their culture, and suggests they allow a member of their crew to remain on his ship as an emissary of the Federation. Bailey happily volunteers, and Balok gives them a tour of his ship.

Production
The episode was the first episode of the regular series to be produced, after the two pilots, "The Cage" and "Where No Man Has Gone Before", which had been made in 1964 and 1965.  It was shot at a different stage, in Hollywood. Sets were transferred from Desilu's Culver City location, where later in the series a new engine room set would be constructed for a following episode ("The Enemy Within" production 005). Shooting started on May 24, 1966. The episode was held back until November due to the amount of special effects scenes that were not completed, becoming the 10th episode to be broadcast.  NBC preferred planet-based stories which were ready to air before "The Corbomite Maneuver" because the miniature footage was not completed or ready when the series premiered.

Reception
In 2009, Zack Handlen of The A.V. Club gave the episode an 'A' rating, describing it as "TOS [The Original Series] at its best—gripping, well-paced, and thematically coherent," and noting the ending's note of optimism.

In 2010, SciFiNow ranked this the sixth-best episode of the original series.

Io9 rated it the 14th best of all Star Trek episodes, in 2014.

In 2015, WIRED magazine did not recommend skipping this episode in their binge-watching guide for the original series.

In 2016, The Hollywood Reporter rated "The Corbomite Maneuver" the 45th best television episode of all Star Trek franchise television prior to Star Trek: Discovery, including live-action and the animated series but not counting the movies. In 2016, they ranked this episode as the 16th greatest episode of the original series.

In 2017, Business Insider ranked "The Corbomite Maneuver" the 8th best episode of the original series.

In 2017, Den of Geek praised this episode as one of the "most thoughtful episodes of the entire franchise" and noting how it set the trend for bizarre first contact situations.

In 2018, PopMatters ranked this the 9th best episode of the original series.

Actor Clint Howard, who played Balok in this episode, was very impressed with the acting opportunities in the Star Trek franchise, having acted multiple times including in three other Star Trek series. On being interviewed by StarTrek.com about his roles in Star Trek (TOSs "The Corbomite Maneuver" (1966), DS9s "Past Tense: Part II" (1995), and DSCs "Will You Take My Hand?" (2018)), he stated "Oh, sure. I'm an actor and I love gainful employment. Virtually every job offer gets a legitimate consideration from me, but the fact that it's Star Trek is a yes at the drop of a hat. How many people have been on shows 50 years ago and are still being asked to be in incarnations of the same franchise?" Howard also appeared in Star Trek: Enterprise’s 2002 episode "Acquisition".

In 2018, Collider ranked this the 19th best episode of the original television series.

In 2019, Nerdist included this episode on their "Best of Kirk" binge-watching guide.

In 2021, Den of Geek ranked this the number three episode of the original series, remarking "Like a good bottle of tranya, this episode only improves with time".

Parody
 At the Rally to Restore Sanity and/or Fear on October 30, 2010, Jon Stewart used the imaginary threat of "corbomite" in bottled water to illustrate how media figures (personified by Stephen Colbert) create and magnify fears in the public.

See also
"The Deadly Years" - A season two episode in which Kirk reuses the corbomite bluff to escape the Romulans.

References

External links

"The Corbomite Maneuver" Review of the remastered version at TrekMovie.com
"The Corbomite Maneuver" Side-by-side comparisons before and after remastering
"The Corbomite Maneuver" Script Review

Star Trek: The Original Series (season 1) episodes
1966 American television episodes
Television episodes written by Jerry Sohl